Siaka Tiéné (born 22 February 1982) is an Ivorian former professional footballer who primarily played as a left-back. Having begun at ASEC Mimosas in his native Ivory Coast and Mamelodi Sundowns in South Africa, he went on to spend most of his professional career in France.

He amassed 96 appearances scoring twice for the Ivory Coast national team and was part of the squads at seven Africa Cup of Nations tournaments (2002, 2006, 2008, 2010, 2012, 2013, and 2015) and at the 2010 FIFA World Cup.

Club career
Tiéné started his career at homeland club ASEC Abidjan, where he came through the famed youth academy that has produced many of the Ivory Coast national team of today, before he eventually moved abroad to play in the South African Premier Soccer League for Mamelodi Sundowns.

In the summer of 2005, he made the move to Europe to play for French Ligue 1 club Saint-Étienne, where he stayed until October 2006. He joined Ligue 2 side Stade de Reims on loan after being unable to get a place in the Saint-Étienne midfield. He returned to Saint-Étienne during the summer of 2007.

In June 2010, Tiéné signed a contract with Paris Saint-Germain, where he played for three years. He did not return to Paris after winning the Ligue 1 domestic title in 2012–13.

In June 2013, Tiéné signed a contract with Montpellier. He was released in July 2015, having made 44 league appearances over the course of two seasons.

International career
Tiéné has had a distinguished international career with over 95 caps for the Ivory Coast, representing the team at the 2010 FIFA World Cup and at seven Africa Cup of Nations in 2002, 2006, 2008, 2010, 2012, 2013 and 2015, helping them finish runner-up in 2006 and 2012, while captaining them to victory in 2015.

He was a member of the Ivorian squad for the 2006 African Cup of Nations tournament in Egypt, where the Elephants reached the final. Tiéné was the only player in the Ivorian's African Cup of Nations team not to make it into the 2006 FIFA World Cup squad. He was called up for the Ivory Coast's 2010 African Cup of Nations campaign in Angola. He was head coach Vahid Halilhodžić's first-choice left-back instead of Arthur Boka in the first match at Group B in Cabinda on 11 January, a 0–0 draw against Burkina Faso, and later in the competition.

Career statistics

International

International goals 
Scores and results list Ivory Coast's goal tally first, score column indicates score after each Tiéné goal.

Honours
Paris Saint-Germain
Ligue 1: 2012–13

Ivory Coast
Africa Cup of Nations: 2015
Individual

 Africa Cup of Nations Team of the Tournament: 2013

See also
 List of men's footballers with 100 or more international caps

References

External links

1982 births
Living people
Footballers from Abidjan
Ivorian footballers
Association football defenders
Association football midfielders
Ivory Coast international footballers
2002 African Cup of Nations players
2006 Africa Cup of Nations players
2008 Africa Cup of Nations players
2010 Africa Cup of Nations players
2010 FIFA World Cup players
2012 Africa Cup of Nations players
2013 Africa Cup of Nations players
2015 Africa Cup of Nations players
Africa Cup of Nations-winning players
FIFA Century Club
Ligue 1 players
AS Saint-Étienne players
Stade de Reims players
Valenciennes FC players
Montpellier HSC players
Paris Saint-Germain F.C. players
Mamelodi Sundowns F.C. players
ASEC Mimosas players
Ivorian expatriate footballers
Expatriate footballers in France
Expatriate soccer players in South Africa
Ivorian expatriate sportspeople in South Africa